"Lipstick" is a song by the Canadian singer Elise Estrada. It peaked at number 46 on the Canadian Hot 100.

Music video
The music video was shot in London, England.

Charts

References

2010 singles
2010 songs
Songs written by Elise Estrada